Dharmadam State assembly constituency is one of the 140 state legislative assembly constituencies in Kerala, in southern India. It is also one of the 7 state legislative assembly constituencies included in the Kannur Lok Sabha constituency.
 As of the 2021 assembly elections, the current MLA is Pinarayi Vijayan of CPI(M).

Local self governed segments
Dharmadam Niyama Sabha constituency is composed of the following local self governed segments:

Members of Legislative Assembly
The following list contains all members of Kerala legislative assembly who have represented Dharmadam Niyama Sabha Constituency during the period of various assemblies:

Election results
Percentage change (±%) denotes the change in the number of votes from the immediate previous election.

Niyamasabha Election 2021
There were 193,486 registered voters in Dharmadam Constituency for the 2021 Kerala Niyama Sabha Election.

Niyamasabha Election 2016
There were 1,84,431 registered voters in Dharmadam Constituency for the 2016 Kerala Niyamasabha Election.

Niyamasabha Election 2011 
There were 1,63,674 registered voters in the constituency for the 2011 election.

See also
 Dharmadom
 Edakkad (State Assembly constituency)
 Kannur district
 List of constituencies of the Kerala Legislative Assembly
 2016 Kerala Legislative Assembly election

References 

Assembly constituencies of Kerala

State assembly constituencies in Kannur district